Alamo Navajo School Board, Inc. (ANSB) refers to the entity controlling a K-12 tribal school in Alamo, New Mexico. It is affiliated with the Bureau of Indian Affairs (BIA). It also maintains a clinic and other public infrastructure in Alamo.

History
Due to the passage of the Indian Self Determination and Education Assistance Act, a local school board was established in 1979.

Alamo Community Navajo school opened with grades K-8 on October 1, 1979. Its initial campus was four portable buildings. The high school was established on December 15, 1980.

By 2012 it was the only employer in Alamo. The school board, federally funded, was used as a vehicle to have public works projects without needing to involve the Navajo Nation bureaucracy. Cindy Yurth of the Navajo Times wrote that it is "the de facto government of Alamo".

In 2018 a group of parents criticized the school board for spending $497,000 on expenses not directly related to education.

In 2018 a group of parents collected 299 signatures on a petition to recall board members under the terms set by the Navajo Election Administration.

In 2019 the federal courts indicted three former board members, accusing them of lying about taking business trips so they could take federal funds.

Student body
In 2018 the number of students was under 300.

Student achievement
In the 2014–2015 school year, as per BIE statistics, 1% of the students were categorized as having proficiency in mathematics. This increased to 3% in the 2015–2016 school year. The percentage of students proficient in English in the 2015–2016 school year was 4%.

See also
 Alamo Navajo Indian Reservation

References

External links
 Alamo Navajo School Board

Public K-12 schools in the United States
Public elementary schools in New Mexico
Public middle schools in New Mexico
Public high schools in New Mexico
1979 establishments in New Mexico
Educational institutions established in 1979
Education in Socorro County, New Mexico
Education on the Navajo Nation